The Three Principles may refer to:

 The Three Principles of the People in Nationalist China
 "The Three Principles of the People", the national anthem of the Republic of China
 The Three Principles of Appeal, an approach towards persuasion
 The Three Principles, an approach to self-help, first articulated by Sydney Banks in the 1970s